William Doris (15 April 1860 – 13 September 1926) was an Irish politician, Member of Parliament, and co-founder of The Mayo News.

Biography
Doris was a solicitor in Dublin, active in Nationalist politics from the 1880s when he was assistant secretary of the Irish National Land League, and in this role was arrested in November 1881 and imprisoned for six months in Dundalk jail.   On 3 December 1892 The Mayo News a local newspaper in Mayo, was co-founded by William and his brother Patrick Doris. The price of The Mayo News was one penny.

In 1898, Mayo County Council was set up under the Local Government (Ireland) Act 1898. Doris was chairman of Westport UDC 1899-1910 and vice-chairman of Mayo County Council 1900–08, speaking at the latter's first meeting on 22 April 1899.

Political career
William Doris was a Member of Parliament for the constituency of West Mayo from 15 January 1910 to 14 December 1918 as a member of the Irish Parliamentary Party.  His defeat of William O'Brien in West Mayo in 1910 was a decisive defeat for O'Brien's All-for-Ireland League. Like the rest of the Irish Party, William Doris supported the United Kingdom during the First World War, and this led to alienation from his brother Patrick. His own defeat in West Mayo in 1918 is the largest fall in percentage share of vote (65.1%).
 

Doris was first recorded in the House of Commons of the United Kingdom, Westminster, on 15 March 1910 on the topic of Old Age Pensions (Ireland).  He was last recorded in the Commons, on 14 November 1918 under the topic of Evicted Tenants. He was a Whip of the Irish Parliamentary Party under the leadership of John Redmond during this period.

In letters to the Irish Independent in 1924, William Doris wrote a stout defence of the Irish Parliamentary Party in relation to Irish partition.  He pointed out that one of the principal consequences of the Sinn Féin policy of refusing to take up seats in the Westminster Parliament was that the establishment of a Protestant-dominated parliament in Northern Ireland in the Government of Ireland Act 1920 went through with little opposition. '...the handing over of the lives and properties, and the social, political, commercial and religious interests of 350,000 Catholics and Nationalists in the North to the tender mercies of an Orange parliament in Belfast has been the direct result of the destruction of the Irish Party in 1918.  The 1920 Partition Act was carried because there was nobody to oppose it.'  The Independent refused to print Doris's letters in full, and they were therefore printed by his former Parliamentary colleague J. P. Hayden in his newspaper, the Westmeath Examiner, 5 July 1924, under the heading 'The Canker of Partition'.

References

External links 
 
 

1860 births
1926 deaths
Irish newspaper founders
Local councillors in County Mayo
Politicians from County Mayo
Members of the Parliament of the United Kingdom for County Mayo constituencies (1801–1922)
UK MPs 1910
UK MPs 1910–1918
Irish solicitors